Haverly Peak is a peak rising to ,  east of the head of Azure Cove, Flandres Bay, on the northeast coast of Kyiv Peninsula, Graham Land, Antarctica. In association with the names of cartographers grouped near this area, it was named by the UK Antarctic Place-Names Committee (UK-APC) in 1986 after William R. Haverly of the Cartographic Section at the Foreign and Commonwealth Office from 1970, and its Head from 1986, with responsibility for preparing UK-APC maps.

References

 SCAR Composite Gazetteer of Antarctica.

Mountains of Graham Land
Danco Coast